Clayton County is located in the north central portion of the U.S. state of Georgia. As of 2021, the population was estimated to be 297,100 by the Census Bureau. The county seat is Jonesboro.

Clayton County is included in the Atlanta metropolitan area, and is the sixth most-populous county in the state. It is the home of most of Hartsfield–Jackson Atlanta International Airport, the busiest airport in the world by total passengers.

History
The county was established in 1858 and named in honor of Augustin Smith Clayton (1783–1839), who served in the United States House of Representatives from 1832 until 1835.

Clayton County was a battle site during the American Civil War, with the Battle of Jonesborough and the Battle of Lovejoy's Station taking place in the area.

Geography
It is the third-smallest county by area in Georgia.

The eastern portion of Clayton County, between Forest Park and Lovejoy, is located in the Upper Ocmulgee River sub-basin of the Altamaha River basin.  The western portion of the county is located in the Upper Flint River sub-basin of the ACF River Basin (Apalachicola-Chattahoochee-Flint River Basin).

Adjacent counties
 DeKalb County (northeast)
 Henry County (east)
 Spalding County (south)
 Fayette County (southwest)
 Fulton County (northwest)

Demographics

2020 Census

As of the 2020 United States census, there were 297,595 people, 97,030 households, and 62,746 families residing in the county.

2010 Census
As of the 2010 United States Census, there were 259,424 people, 90,633 households, and 62,389 families residing in the county. The racial makeup of the county was 66.1% black or African American, 18.87% white, 5.0% Asian, 0.4% American Indian, 0.1% Pacific islander, 7.1% from other races, and 2.5% from two or more races. Those of Hispanic or Latino origin made up 13.66% of the population. In terms of ancestry, and 4.9% were "American".

Of the 90,633 households, 42.1% had children under the age of 18 living with them, 36.4% were married couples living together, 25.3% had a female householder with no husband present, 31.2% were non-families, and 25.4% of all households were made up of individuals. The average household size was 2.82 and the average family size was 3.37. The median age was 31.6 years.

The median income for a household in the county was $43,311 and the median income for a family was $48,064. Males had a median income of $36,177 versus $32,460 for females. The per capita income for the county was $18,958. About 13.6% of families and 16.7% of the population were below the poverty line, including 24.5% of those under age 18 and 8.8% of those age 65 or over.

2000 Census
As of the 2000 census, there were 236,517 people, 82,243 households, and 59,214 families residing in the county. The racial makeup of the county was 37.94% White, 51.55% Black or African American, 0.32% Native American, 4.49% Asian, 0.07% Pacific Islander, 3.55% from other races, and 2.08% from two or more races. 7.50% of the population were Hispanic or Latino of any race.

Estimated 2006 population is 271,240, with a racial make-up of 20.4% white non-Hispanic, 62.9% African American, 5% Asian, 11.3% Hispanic or Latino, 0.4% American Indian or Alaska Native, and 0.1% Pacific Islander. 1.5% were reported as multi-racial.

There were 82,243 households, out of which 40.70% had children under the age of 18 living with them, 45.70% were married couples living together, 20.30% had a female householder with no husband present, and 28.00% were non-families. 21.80% of all households were made up of individuals, and 3.60% had someone living alone who was 65 years of age or older. The average household size was 2.84 and the average family size was 3.30.

In the county, the population was spread out, with 30.00% under the age of 18, 10.40% from 18 to 24, 35.40% from 25 to 44, 18.40% from 45 to 64, and 5.90% who were 65 years of age or older. The median age was 30 years. For every 100 females, there were 94.50 males. For every 100 females age 18 and over, there were 90.90 males.

The median income for a household in the county was $42,697, and the median income for a family was $46,782. Males had a median income of $32,118 versus $26,926 for females. The per capita income for the county was $18,079. About 8.20% of families and 10.10% of the population were below the poverty line, including 13.20% of those under age 18 and 8.90% of those age 65 or over.

The last quarter-century has seen significant change in the racial composition of the county's population. In 1980, Clayton county's population was 150,357 — 91% white and 9% minority, while in 2006 the population was approximately 271,240 — 20% white and 80% minority.

Crime and policing
The Clayton County Police Department has an authorized strength of 525 personnel headed by Chief Kevin Roberts. Other law enforcement services (courts, jail, warrants) are provided by the Clayton County Sheriff's Office.

On April 26, 2021, Sheriff Victor Hill was indicted on charges of federal civil rights violations. On June 2, 2021, he was suspended by Governor Brian Kemp following a review of the indictment. On October 26, 2022, Sheriff Victor Hill was found guilty of violating civil rights of jail detainees.

Economy
The unemployment rate in Clayton County was 3.4% as of November 2019. Future job growth over the next ten years was predicted to be at 29.90%. Clayton County's sales tax rate is 8.00%. The income tax is 6.00%. Clayton County's income and salaries per capita is $18,735, which includes all adults and children. The median household income is $39,699.

ValuJet Airlines was headquartered in northern, unincorporated Clayton County, near Hartsfield Jackson Atlanta International Airport, in the 1990s.

Transportation

Airports
 Hartsfield-Jackson Atlanta International Airport

Major highways

  Interstate 75
  Interstate 85
  Interstate 285
  Interstate 675
  U.S. Route 19
  U.S. Route 23
  U.S. Route 29
  U.S. Route 41
  State Route 3
  State Route 3 Connector
  State Route 42
  State Route 54
  State Route 85
  State Route 138
  State Route 138 Spur
  State Route 139
  State Route 314
  State Route 331
  State Route 401 (unsigned designation for I-75)
  State Route 403 (unsigned designation for I-85)
  State Route 407 (unsigned designation for I-285)
  State Route 413 (unsigned designation for I-675)

Mass transit

Bus
MARTA and Xpress GA / RTA commuter buses serve the county.

Rail
Commuter rail service is proposed to serve Clayton County along the Norfolk Southern line, with proposed stations in Forest Park, Morrow, Jonesboro, and initially ending at Lovejoy.

The Metropolitan Atlanta Rapid Transit Authority's Airport station is located in Clayton.

Pedestrians and cycling

 Jesters Creek Trail
 Morrow Trail
 Clayton Connects

Education

Clayton County Public Schools is the fifth largest school system in Georgia. The district currently has 53,000 students enrolled in its 63 schools. Under the current Superintendent Dr. Morcease J. Beasley, the district has a strategic plan that includes the vision and mission statements. Clayton County has 22 elementary and five middle schools that have been deemed by the Georgia Department of Education as Distinguished Schools. This is based on the number of consecutive years of making AYP.

Special schools and programs
Lovejoy High School hosts the district International Baccalaureate Program (IB). The IB Diploma Program is designed as an academically challenging and balanced program of education with final exams that prepare students for success at the university level and life beyond.

CCPS has two charter schools. Unidos Dual Language, Georgia's first public dual language school is a model of excellence in language education. Unidos serves students in pre-kindergarten through sixth grades. The second charter school is the Elite Scholars Academy; the school serves grades 6-10 and planned to expand to the twelfth grade by 2014. The school operates on a year-round calendar. Any student in the district may apply to enroll. Selection is based on a random lottery.

Clayton County also has a Math and Science Magnet and three fine arts magnet programs at Jackson Elementary, MD Robert's Middle, and Martha Ellen Stilwell. Enrollment is based on application and/or audition.

2008 de-accreditation
The 50,000-student school system was the first in the nation to lose accreditation since 1969. The Southern Association of Colleges and Schools (SACS) revoked the school district's accreditation on August 28, 2008. It was only the second system in the nation to do so since 1960. A grand jury investigated and considered possible criminal indictments against the Clayton County School Board. At issue was whether the school board committed malfeasance in ignoring the shortcomings of the school system and violating its own rules concerning the awarding of bids of contracts.

School Board Chairwoman Ericka Davis announced her resignation on April 2, 2008, amidst the allegations. Clayton County Commission Chairman Eldrin Bell called for the resignations of all Clayton County School Board members. Amid controversy and orders for the police to quiet citizens, the Clayton County School Board hired a new temporary superintendent on April 26, 2008. This was despite the fact that the new superintendent did not meet the qualifications set forth by SACS.

The Clayton County Public School System was re-accredited by SACS on May 1, 2009.

Higher education
Clayton State University is located in Morrow.

Media 

 Clayton Crescent: news about Clayton County and adjoining areas, part of the Institute for Nonprofit News
 Clayton News (formerly Clayton News-Daily): county legal organ, part of the Southern Community Newspapers, Inc. chain
 South Atlanta Magazine: lifestyle and profiles magazine focusing on Clayton County
 CCTV23: Clayton County government access television (Ch. 23 on Xfinity, Ch. 99 on AT&T UVerse)

Communities

Cities

 College Park (part)
 Forest Park
 Jonesboro
 Lake City
 Lovejoy
 Morrow
 Riverdale

Census-designated places
 Bonanza
 Conley
 Irondale

Unincorporated communities
 Ellenwood
 Mountain View
 Rex
 Hampton

Politics
For most of the 1960s to the 1980s, Clayton County was a swing county. It voted for Governor Jimmy Carter in 1976 with around 65 percent of the vote, but then voting for Ronald Reagan with over seventy percent of the vote in 1984. However, due to extensive black in-migration, starting in 1992 Clayton County has swung heavily Democratic and is now one of the most Democratic counties in the country. It has given the Democratic presidential candidate over eighty percent of the vote in every election since 2008. In 2020, for instance, it gave Joe Biden 85 percent of the vote, his strongest showing in the state.

In popular culture
Parts of Margaret Mitchell's epic 1936 novel Gone with the Wind and the famous 1939 motion picture Gone with the Wind were set in Clayton County, including the location of the fictional plantation, Tara. Tara Boulevard was named for the plantation, and is the main north–south road through the county, carrying U.S. 41 and lesser-known State Route 3. Parts of the novels Rhett Butler's People and Scarlett and the Scarlett television miniseries also took place in Clayton County. Rhett Butler's People is a prequel, sequel, and companion to Gone with the Wind. Scarlett is a sequel to Gone with the Wind, and also takes place briefly in Clayton County. The fictional Twelve Oaks Plantation and others mentioned in these novels are located in and around Clayton County. Mitchell's family's plantation, Rural Home, was located in Clayton County.

The 2012 film Flight features Clayton County throughout the film, with Hall's Flying Ranch in Hampton, Georgia, doubling as Denzel Washington's character's childhood home.

Parts of the film Smokey and the Bandit were shot in and around Clayton County, namely in Jonesboro, as evidenced by a sign in the background of one of the scenes. Even though this particular scene was supposed to be set in Arkansas, a "Willow Bend" sign advertising brick homes in Clayton County can be spotted behind Sheriff George Branford. Many back roads and the movie town of Texarkana are actually the roads and the town of Jonesboro.

Trinidad James filmed his music video for the song "All Gold Everything" in Clayton County.

Rap artist Waka Flocka Flame is from Clayton County; he resides in Riverdale.

See also

 National Register of Historic Places listings in Clayton County, Georgia
 Bostock v. Clayton County, Georgia
List of counties in Georgia

References

External links
 Clayton County Government
 Clayton County Visitors Bureau – For information on history, attractions, and events
 Clayton County historical marker

 
1858 establishments in Georgia (U.S. state)
Georgia (U.S. state) counties
Clayton
Populated places established in 1858
Black Belt (U.S. region)
Majority-minority counties in Georgia